Short course swimming at the 2009 Asian Indoor Games was held in Mỹ Đình National Aquatics Sports Complex, Hanoi, Vietnam from 4 November to 7 November 2009.

Medalists

Men

Women

Medal table

Results

Men

50 m freestyle
4 November

100 m freestyle
7 November

200 m freestyle
6 November

50 m backstroke
5 November

100 m backstroke
6 November

50 m breaststroke
5 November

100 m breaststroke
4 November

50 m butterfly
6 November

100 m butterfly
5 November

100 m individual medley
7 November

200 m individual medley
4 November

4 × 50 m freestyle relay
6 November

4 × 100 m freestyle relay
5 November

4 × 50 m medley relay
4 November

4 × 100 m medley relay
7 November

Women

50 m freestyle
4 November

100 m freestyle
7 November

200 m freestyle
6 November

50 m backstroke
5 November

100 m backstroke
6 November

50 m breaststroke
7 November

100 m breaststroke
4 November

50 m butterfly
6 November

100 m butterfly
5 November

100 m individual medley
7 November

200 m individual medley
4 November

4 × 50 m freestyle relay
6 November

4 × 100 m freestyle relay
5 November

4 × 50 m medley relay
4 November

4 × 100 m medley relay
7 November

References 
 Results
 Results at swimmingworldmagazine.com

2009 Asian Indoor Games events
Asian Indoor Games
2009